Ricardo José Villar Rodríguez (born 2 January 1989) is an Argentine footballer who plays for San Luis de Quillota.

Career 
He was signed for Cesena along with his brother Matías Villar which both left Sportivo Palermo and Salernitana at the same time. But Matías played for Verucchio in 2006–07 season.

He made his first team debut during 2006–07 season. Villar joined Udinese Calcio on 30 January 2009. He played two half seasons at Primavera, while the second one (2009–10) as overage player.

In January transfer windows, he left for Cremonese on loan. In mid-2010 he was sold to Triestina and immediately loaned to  Como.

He was transferred to Chilean club San Luis de Quillota.

After some years in this team, he closed his career.

References

External links
 Gazzetta.it

1989 births
Living people
Argentine footballers
Argentine expatriate footballers
San Luis de Quillota footballers
U.S. Salernitana 1919 players
A.C. Cesena players
Udinese Calcio players
Sarmiento de Resistencia footballers
U.S. Triestina Calcio 1918 players
Como 1907 players
Serie B players
Primera B de Chile players
Expatriate footballers in Chile
Expatriate footballers in Italy
Association football midfielders
Sportspeople from Jujuy Province